Running on Ice is the second album by Vertical Horizon, released independently in 1995, and later re-released by RCA. It was produced by John Alagia (John Mayer, Dave Matthews Band), Doug Derryberry and Matt Scannell. Though still technically a duo and acoustic based, Running on Ice featured many guest musicians (most notably Carter Beauford of the Dave Matthews Band on drums), giving the album more of a full band sound. Derryberry also contributed keyboards and vocals. Two of the album's songs ("Wash Away" and "The Man Who Would Be Santa") appeared on the 2nd Aware Compilation.

Track listing
"Heart in Hand" (Scannell) - 4:36
"Wash Away" (Kane) - 4:30
"Fragments" (Scannell) - 3:47
"Famous" (Kane/Scannell) - 3:03
"The Man Who Would Be Santa" (Scannell) - 4:43
"Angel Without Wings" (Kane) - 4:19
"Answer Me" (Scannell) - 5:31
"Life in the City" (Scannell) - 4:13
"Japan" (Kane) - 5:24
"Call it Even" (Scannell) - 3:40
"Sunrays and Saturdays" (Scannell) - 3:33
"Candyman" (Kane) - 4:16
"Falling Down" (Moylan/Scannell) - 4:12
"Goodnight My Friend" (Scannell) - 6:33

References

Vertical Horizon albums
1995 albums
Albums produced by John Alagía
Aware Records albums
RCA Records albums